Mark Bentz is a Canadian para-alpine skier, massage therapist and business owner. He represented Canada at the 1984 Winter Paralympics in alpine skiing.

He won the gold medal in the Men's Alpine Combination B2 event and also in the Men's Downhill B2 event.

He also competed in the Men's Giant Slalom B2 event and finished in 7th place.

Personal life 
In 1995, Mark became a registered massage therapist, graduating from the West Coast College of Massage Therapy. In 1997, Mark founded Everest Therapeutics, one of Canada's largest massage therapy clinics. In 2005, he opened a multidisciplinary clinic, Electra Health, which houses Everest Therapeutics, along with physiotherapists, chiropractors, acupuncturists, clinical counsellors, osteopaths and more.

In 2019, Mark founded the PAARCC program – a multidisciplinary style program that designs unique, comprehensive rehabilitation programs for people who have been in car accidents.

Mark resides in Vancouver, Canada with his family.

See also 
 List of Paralympic medalists in alpine skiing

References 

Living people
Year of birth missing (living people)
Place of birth missing (living people)
Paralympic alpine skiers of Canada
Alpine skiers at the 1984 Winter Paralympics
Medalists at the 1984 Winter Paralympics
Paralympic gold medalists for Canada
Paralympic medalists in alpine skiing